Analía Viviana Marín (born 4 May 1983) is an Argentine rower. She competed in the women's single sculls event at the 2004 Summer Olympics.

References

External links
 

1983 births
Living people
Argentine female rowers
Olympic rowers of Argentina
Rowers at the 2004 Summer Olympics
Rowers from Buenos Aires